The Joseph Annin House is a single-family home located at 218 Monroe Street in Saline, Michigan. It was listed on the National Register of Historic Places in 1985.

History
This house was constructed in 1863 for farmer Joseph Annin. In 1867 it was purchased by Alfred Miller, who owned a local hotel. In 1873 it changed hands again, this time to Harvey Bennett, and in 1876 John Hull purchased it. It was later home to the Peoples family, who purchased the home in 1918.

Description
The Joseph Annin House is a two-story brick Italianate structure shaped like a cube. It is five bays across, with a central entrance portico. It has hip roof with matching interior chimney sand overhanging eaves supported by paired ornamental brackets. Between the brackets are small rectangular windows. Window openings on the primary facades are shuttered double sash with decorative wooden lintels above. A wooden barn/carriage house with a gabled roof and vertical board-and-batten siding sits
behind the house.

References

National Register of Historic Places in Washtenaw County, Michigan
Italianate architecture in Michigan
Residential buildings completed in 1863